Bodmin Jail (alternatively Bodmin Gaol) is a historic former prison situated in Bodmin, on the edge of Bodmin Moor in Cornwall. Built in 1779 and closed in 1927, a large range of buildings fell into ruin, but parts of the prison have been turned into a tourist attraction, and more recently another large part was converted into a hotel.

History 
Bodmin Gaol was designed by Sir John Call and built in 1779 by prisoners of war, and was operational for 150 years, in which it saw over 50 public hangings. It was the first British prison to hold prisoners in individual cells.

The jail closed in 1927. Since that date, there has been no prison within the county of Cornwall.

During World War I, the prison was used for holding some of Britain's national treasures including the Domesday Book and the Crown Jewels of the United Kingdom.

Today 
Bodmin Jail is now a hotel as of 2021 and after redevelopment that started in 2015, Bodmin Jail Limited now operates as a museum, gift shop and hosts guided tours at the site.

Ghosts 
Bodmin Jail has inspired many ghost stories, attracted paranormal researchers, and ghost walk events are held for tourists there.

Series 6, Episode 1 of Most Haunted, a British-made reality TV show, saw the crew attempt their paranormal activities at the jail with presenter Yvette Fielding and medium, Derek Acorah. After many unsuccessful attempts, the team supposedly made contact with many light and sound entities, whilst Acorah claimed to have been possessed by a spirit named Kreed Kafer, a South African. It was later revealed that "Kreed Kafer" was a fictional character, who was created purely by parapsychologist and crew member Ciarán O'Keeffe, to test Derek Acorah and his abilities. The name was created because it was an anagram of the phrase 'Derek Faker'.

Notable former inmates 

 F. Digby Hardy, inmate of the naval prison

References

External links 

History of Bodmin Gaol from theprison.org.uk
Bodmin Jail Official Webpage

Bodmin
Prisons in Cornwall
Museums in Cornwall
1779 establishments in England
1927 disestablishments in England
Reportedly haunted locations in South West England
Prison museums in the United Kingdom
Defunct prisons in England
Debtors' prisons